The discography of Indian singer, rapper & songwriter Arjan Dhillon consists of three studio albums, one extended play, thirty nine singles, including three songs as a featured artist, and nineteen songs as a lyricist.

Albums

Studio albums

Extended plays

Singles

As lead artist

Film soundtracks

As featured artist 

Arjan was also credited as songwriter for lead artist

Songwriting discography

References 

Discographies of Indian artists